GVO may refer to:
 Gastric variceal obliteration
 Gavião of Jiparaná, a language of Brazil
 Generalized velocity obstacle
 Greenwich Village Orchestra, based in New York City
 Gruye-Vogt Organization, design firm founded in 1966 in San Francisco